was a Japanese waka poet of the early eleventh century. One of her poems was included in the Ogura Hyakunin Isshu.

Biography 

Starting around 1009, she joined her mother in serving Empress Shōshi.

A target of many suitors, she eventually married . She bore him a child, but died thereafter, still in her late twenties.

Poetry 
Four of her poems were included in imperial anthologies such as the Goshūi Wakashū and the Kin'yō Wakashū.

Ōe-yama 
The following poem by her was included as No. 60 in Fujiwara no Teika's Ogura Hyakunin Isshu:

In later literature 
Numerous anecdotes about her were incorporated into later  and setsuwa collections.

An otogizōshi, Koshikibu, was also written.

References

Bibliography 

 
McMillan, Peter. 2010 (1st ed. 2008). One Hundred Poets, One Poem Each. New York: Columbia University Press. 
Suzuki Hideo, Yamaguchi Shin'ichi, Yoda Yasushi. 2009 (1st ed. 1997). Genshoku: Ogura Hyakunin Isshu. Tokyo: Bun'eidō.

11th century in Japan
11th-century Japanese poets
Ladies-in-waiting of Heian-period Japan
Japanese women poets
Hyakunin Isshu poets
Deaths_in_childbirth